The 1906–07 Football League season was Birmingham Football Club's 15th in the Football League and their 7th in the First Division. They finished in ninth place in the 20-team league. They also took part in the 1906–07 FA Cup, entering at the first round proper and losing in that round to Liverpool.

Twenty-six players made at least one appearance in nationally organised first-team competition, and there were twelve different goalscorers. Forwards Benny Green and Billy Jones were ever-present over the 39-match season; full-back Frank Stokes and half-backs Billy Beer and Walter Wigmore missed only one, and three other players exceeded 30 appearances. Billy Jones was leading scorer with 15 goals, all of which came in the league.

The last league match at the Coventry Road ground, which no longer met the club's needs, was played on 22 December 1906. Birmingham beat Bury 3–1. The last goal was scored by Arthur Mounteney, and the Birmingham Daily Post described how 
Within months the ground had been demolished and the land cleared for housing.

Construction of the St Andrew's Ground, in the Bordesley district some three-quarters of a mile (1 km) closer to the city centre, had taken less than a year from leasing the land to official opening on Boxing Day 1906. Heavy overnight snowfall put the ceremony, and the scheduled match against Middlesbrough, at risk. Dozens of volunteers, including members of the club's board, worked all morning to clear the pitch. The game finally kicked off an hour late, finishing goalless in front of 32,000 spectators. The Birmingham Daily Post editorial next day suggested that "the fact that so many spectators attended under such adverse conditions augurs well for the step that the directors have taken", and that the directors were "to be congratulated in having provided their supporters with a ground second to none in the country". The Football Association chose the ground to host the FA Cup semi-final in March 1907 between Sheffield Wednesday and Woolwich Arsenal.

Football League First Division

League table (part)

FA Cup

Appearances and goals

Players with name struck through and marked  left the club during the playing season.

See also
Birmingham City F.C. seasons

References
General
 Matthews, Tony (1995). Birmingham City: A Complete Record. Breedon Books (Derby). .
 Matthews, Tony (2010). Birmingham City: The Complete Record. DB Publishing (Derby). .
 Source for match dates and results: "Birmingham City 1906–1907: Results". Statto Organisation. Retrieved 22 May 2012.
 Source for lineups, appearances, goalscorers and attendances: Matthews (2010), Complete Record, pp. 258–59. Note that attendance figures are estimated.
 Source for kit: "Birmingham City". Historical Football Kits. Retrieved 22 May 2018.

Specific

Birmingham City F.C. seasons
Birmingham